Jean-Paul Rabaut Saint-Étienne (14 November 1743 – 5 December 1793) was a leader of the French Protestants and a moderate French revolutionary.

Biography
Jean-Paul Rabaut was born in 1743 in Nîmes, in the department of Gard, the son of Paul Rabaut. The additional surname of Saint-Étienne was assumed from a small property near Nîmes. His brothers were Jacques Antoine Rabaut-Pommier and Pierre-Antoine Rabaut-Dupuis, both also politically active.

Like his father, he became a Calvinist pastor, and distinguished himself with his zeal for his co-religionists, becoming a spokesman for the Protestant community in France. He worked closely with Guillaume-Chrétien de Lamoignon de Malesherbes, minister to Louis XVI, and with members of the parlement of the Ancien Régime to obtain formal recognition of Protestant civil rights, despite the concerns of some royal advisors.

Officially ending religious persecution in France, Louis XVI signed the Edict of Tolerance on 7 November 1787, and it was registered in parlement two-and-a-half months later (29 January 1788). This edict offered relief to all the major non-Catholic faiths of the time: Calvinist Huguenots, Lutherans, and Jews. After more than a century of prohibition, it gave them all civil and legal recognition as well as the right to form new congregations openly.

Full religious freedom had to wait two more years for the Declaration of the Rights of Man and Citizen of 1789, but the 1787 Edict of Tolerance was a pivotal step in subduing religious strife, and it officially ended religious persecution in France.

Having gained a reputation with his Histoire primitive de la Grèce, Rabaut de Saint-Étienne was elected deputy to the Estates-General of 1789 by the third estate of the bailliage of Nîmes.

In the Constituent Assembly, he worked on the framing of the constitution; he spoke against the establishment of the republic, which he considered ridiculous; and voted for the suspensive veto, as likely to strengthen the position of the Crown. In the Convention, he sat among the Girondists, opposed the trial of Louis XVI, was a member of the Commission of Twelve and was proscribed with his party.

He remained in hiding for some time, but he was ultimately discovered and guillotined in December 1793.

References

External links
View works by Rabaut de Saint-Étienne at Biodiversity Heritage Library
 Lettres à Monsieur Bailly sur l'histoire primitive de la Grèce (PDF facsimile)

1743 births
1793 deaths
People from Nîmes
French Calvinist and Reformed Christians
French people executed by guillotine during the French Revolution
Presidents of the National Convention